"Smashing Young Man" is a song by American alternative rock band Collective Soul. It is the third single from their second studio album Collective Soul. The song was rumored to have been written as an insult to Smashing Pumpkins lead singer, Billy Corgan, who accused Collective Soul of plagiarizing music.

Track listing 
"Smashing Young Man" — 3:45
"December" (Acoustic live track) — 3:25
"Bleed" (Acoustic live track) — 4:02

Charts

References

1995 singles
1995 songs
Atlantic Records singles
Collective Soul songs
Music videos directed by Chris Applebaum
Songs written by Ed Roland